Sonatsa is a genus of marine, mud-dwelling polychaete worms containing the sole species Sonatsa meridionalis. S. meridionalis was described in 1919 by Ralph Vary Chamberlin from a single specimen collected by the research ship USS Albatross during a 1904–05 survey of the southeast Pacific Ocean. The type specimen was collected between Peru and the Galapagos Islands, from muddy sediment at a depth of around 4 km. The name Sonatsa derives from the Goshute words soma, meaning "many", and natsani, meaning "hook", while the specific name meridionalis is Latin for "southern".

References

Animals described in 1919
Monotypic protostome genera
Polychaete genera